Ett äktenskap i kris  ("A Marriage in Crisis") is a Swedish mini drama television series that aired on TV4 in 1992.

Cast
Christer Flodin
Sten Åke Siewert
Margareta Wikholm

See also
List of Swedish television series

External links
 

Swedish television miniseries
1992 Swedish television series debuts
1992 Swedish television series endings
Swedish drama television series
1990s Swedish television series